The payment schedule of financial instruments defines the dates at which payments are made by one party to another on for example a bond or derivative. It can be either customised or parameterised.

Parameterised Schedule
The schedule is generated based on a set of rules and market conventions to define the frequencies of the payments.

These parameters include:

Payment Frequency (Annually, Semi Annually, Quarterly, Monthly, Weekly, Daily, Continuous)
Payment Day - Day of the month the payment is made
Date rolling - Rule used to adjust the payment date if the schedule date is not a Business Day
 Start Date - Date of the first Payment
 End Date - Also known as the Maturity date. The date of the last payment

Customised Schedule
The schedule consists of a series of dates that define exactly when payments will be made.

The payment schedule can also be linked to achievement or fulfillment of certain predefined tasks or events or even stages against which payments are required to be made by one party to another

Financial markets